Moore Park Beach is a coastal rural locality in the Bundaberg Region, Queensland, Australia. The coastal town of Moore Park is within the locality.

Geography 
Moore Park Beach is on the Coral Sea,  by road north of the city of Bundaberg. It is bordered to the north and north-west by the Kolan River, to the south by the suburbs of Moorland and Welcome Creek, and on the east by Fairymead.

Fairydale is a neighbourhood within the south-east of the locality.

Moore Park Beach is a sandy beach  which extends the entire length of the locality's coastline and beyond to Fairymead.

The most northern part of the locality is protected within the Mouth of Kolan River Conservation Park.

The residential land is in two areas, the coastal strip with predominantly suburban-sized house lots and an area in the west of the locality accessed via Malvern Drive featuring larger rural residential land parcels.

The far south-east of the locality is undeveloped marshland. The remainder of the locality is used for farming, predominantly growing sugarcane.

History
On 3 January 1961, the town and locality were named by Queensland Place Names Board after grazier Isaac Moore of Barambah station in the South Burnett.

Moore Park State School opened on 1 January 2004. It was later renamed Moore Park Beach State School.

The commonest languages spoken at home were English (96%), German, Maltese, Dutch and Italian. 59.1% of residents reported Christianity as their religion, with Anglican 19.8%, Catholic 18.9%, Uniting Church 8.2%, Presbyterian & Reformed 3.3%, and Lutheran 2.7%

Education 

Moore Park Beach State School is a government primary (Prep-6) school for boys and girls at 14 Murdochs Linking Road. In 2018, the school had an enrolment of 193 students with 15 teachers (12 full-time equivalent) and 14 non-teaching staff (8 full-time equivalent).

There is no secondary school in Moore Park Beach. The nearest government secondary school is Bundaberg North State High School in North Bundaberg to the south.

Amenities
There are a number of parks in the area:

 Environmental Reserve Park
 Fauna And Flora Park

 Industrial Park

 Merv Thiele Park

 Moore Park Oval

 Moore Park Wetlands Reserve

 Ray Townson Park

 Royal Palms Estate Park

Attractions
Four-wheel driving is permitted in two sections of the beach, north of Sylvan Drive via Royal Palms Park and south of Lassig Street, with access at those two locations.

Moore Park Surf Lifesaving Club is at Surf Club Drive. The volunteers patrol the beach to support safe swimming.

The beach is also a nesting site for sea turtles including loggerhead sea turtles in summer months.

Transport
Moore Park is served by a limited bus service operated by Stewart & Sons.

References

External links

 
 

Towns in Queensland
Coastal towns in Queensland
Beaches of Queensland
Tourist attractions in Bundaberg
Bundaberg Region
Localities in Queensland